A Walmart greeter is an employee whose role is to wait at the front door of a Walmart store and greet all shoppers who enter. CEO and founder Sam Walton implemented the role nationally in the 1980s. The position is considered to be a big part of the company's identity and culture, as well as one of its most recognized hallmarks.

A Walmart greeter stands at the door. The greeter's primary task is to cross-check customers' receipts when they leave, as well as to provide a sunny disposition to welcome customers.

History 
The idea of having dedicated greeters at the front door of a store may have come from an employee of the company, Lois Richard. She was working in the early 1980s as an invoice clerk at the Walmart store in Crowley, Louisiana. The Walmart store in Crowley, which had opened in 1980, was experiencing shoplifting and had a significant "inventory shrinkage" after two years. The initial idea was to have an employee standing at the door in order to try to decrease shoplifting. After a shoplifting sting conducted by the local police showed that piles of merchandise could have been taken away, Lois Richard pitched the idea the next day to her manager and it was accepted.

In 2019, it was announced that on April 26, greeters would be replaced with 'customer hosts' at 1,000 stores. This new position will require that hosts be able to climb up ladders to get products, lift packages weighing 25 pounds, and stand for long periods of time. The announced change was met with disapproval by disabled greeters. Walmart announced that it would make "every effort" to continue to employ disabled workers in other positions.

Bibliography

References

Walmart
Hospitality occupations